The Beneva Quebec City Marathon, is an annual point-to-point Boston Marathon qualifying marathon (42.195 km/26.219 mi) race between Lévis and Quebec City, Quebec, Canada.  It has been held in August every year since 1998 and currently can reach up to 12,700 participants in all of the events combined.  Along with the full marathon, a half marathon, a 10 km, a 5 km and children's events are arranged as well.

The course distinguishes itself from other races in that kilometre markers are posted in reverse order, indicating the remaining distance to the finish line. Among other things, this allows all events to start at the same time and on the same course, from the appropriate distance away from the finish line.

The race is part of a series of races that go on around Quebec City each year called "Run Quebec City", with the Quebec City Marathon being the most well known event. Other events in the series include the Oasis International Half Marathon each May, the Quebec City Staircase Challenge, including many staircases on a 19 km or 13.5 km course, each June, the Descente Royale (which was postponed in 2013), the Bataille des Plainesa, a 5 km, 10 km and children's race, each June, and the Desjardins Ladies Challenge, a 5 km, 10 km and children's race, each July.

The 2020 in-person edition of the race was cancelled due to the coronavirus pandemic, and the 2021 edition of the race was cancelled after the city pulled funding for the marathon.  Full refunds for registrants were offered in both cases.

Information
The race also features a spectacular event two days before the actual marathon race known as the SSQ Star Race. The race is giant loop which participants may run as many times as they wish within the hour and a half available. The race begins at night, usually around 8pm, and for the first hour and fifteen minutes a musical show will be put on around the course, which is well lit up by many multi-coloured lights, including the LED caps given to each participant. After an hour and thirty-five minutes, just five minutes after the participants finish running, a firework show begins to light up the night sky.

The race is often known for its flashy well-designed medals, given to participants in each event, including the SSQ Star Race and Kids Run.

The top three placers in the marathon, half marathon, 10 km, 5 km, and kids run, are also given prize money ranging from $5000 for first in the full marathon, to $50 for the winner of the kids run.

Past winners

Marathon
Key:

Half-marathon

See also
 List of marathon races in North America

References

External links
 Official Website French
 Official Website English
 Quebec City Marathon Map

Marathons in Canada
Recurring sporting events established in 1998
Sport in Quebec City
Annual sporting events in Canada
1998 establishments in Quebec
Summer events in Canada